Following is a list of justices of the Oklahoma Supreme Court. The court was established when Oklahoma achieved statehood in 1907, and was initially composed of five justices, with the state divided into a corresponding number of judicial districts. In 1917, the court was expanded to nine justices, with the judicial districts being redrawn accordingly, and with the seats for the fourth and fives judicial districts being switched.

Current membership

The justices of the Oklahoma Supreme Court are:

List of former justices

Table

Justices of the Oklahoma Territory Supreme Court
 Edward B. Green, Chief Justice (1890–1893)
 John G. Clark, Associate Justice (1890–1903), Chief Justice 
Abraham Jefferson Seay 1890–92
John H. Burford 1892–1906, Chief Justice 1898–1903
A.G.C. Bierer 1894–98
John L. McAtee 1898–1902
Henry W. Scott (judge) (1892–1896), Chief Justice 1895–1896 
James R. Keaton 1896–98
John C. Tarsney 1896–99
Frank Dale 1893–1898
Bayard T. Hainer 1898–1907
Clinton F. Irwin 1899–1907
Joseph A. Gill 1899 – 1907
J. L. Pancoast  1902–1907
Milton C. Garber 1906–07
James K. Beauchamp 1902–1906
Frank E. Gillette 1902–1907

References

Oklahoma